Pembrey Circuit is a motor racing circuit near Pembrey village, Carmarthenshire, Wales. It is the home of Welsh motorsport, providing racing for cars, motorcycles, karts and trucks. The circuit's facilities have also been used for a single-venue rally.

History

The stimulus for the creation of a racing circuit at Pembrey was the closure of the motor racing facility at Llandow near Cardiff. Port Talbot Motor Cycle Racing Club were the first organisation to put on racing events at this circuit. In 1981 the Welsh Race Drivers' Association (WRDA) was formed with the expressed intention of developing a new race circuit in Wales. At the same time the former RAF airfield at Pembrey, which had been used as a chicken farm, was acquired by Llanelli Borough Council. Following a representation by the WRDA the decision was taken to construct a racing circuit at the venue. The first race meeting was held on 21 May 1989, and the winner of the first race at the circuit was Nigel Petch in an MGB.

In 1990 the BARC signed a 50-year lease to operate the circuit on behalf of Carmarthenshire County Council.

Testing
The circuit is popular for testing, mainly due to its variety of fast sweeping corners and tight hairpins. It is often referred to as a drivers favourite. Formula One teams have tested at the circuit including McLaren and their drivers Ayrton Senna and Alain Prost in the late 1980s. Arrows, Benetton, Jordan and Williams all tested at Pembrey in the early 1990s with BAR being the last Formula One team to test at Pembrey in 1998. The Seat and VX Racing BTCC teams have tested there in previous years, as has Nigel Mansell in a GP Masters car. These F1 cars are likely to have set times faster than the official lap record, and indeed locals at the circuit still talk of the sensational unofficial lap record set by Ayrton Senna. However, convention dictates that the official lap record is the fastest lap set under racing conditions, so that honour goes to Argentine Formula 3 driver, Brian Smith, who in a Dallara F397 set a time of 50.079 seconds in 1997.

Senna's lap time in testing was 44.43.

In recent seasons the circuit has been a popular venue for GT and F3 teams to test at, not only because of the quality of the circuit, but also due to the less stringent noise restrictions in place than at other British circuits.

Configurations

The circuit has two different sections, an all tarmac race circuit and a rally cross circuit utilizing some of the race circuit with an addition off-road surface. The circuit is operated by the British Automobile Racing Club (BARC) under the terms of a 50-year lease from Carmarthenshire County Council. A third configuration was also used in 1996, which was that of a short oval. This followed the race circuit from the Start/Finish straight, through the first two corners of the track, before turning left at the third corner and returning to the Start/Finish straight. There were plans to include a quarter mile drag strip, but this never came to fruition.The proposed Drag Strip never got off the ground.

Major events

The circuit has hosted the British Touring Car Championship twice, in 1992 and 1993 at which time the championship was the most popular motorsport series in the UK outside Formula One. Formula 3 races have also been run at Pembrey Circuit, and indeed many recent Formula 1 drivers including Jenson Button raced at Pembrey in their early F3 days. Pembrey twice hosted the European Rallycross Championship in 1997 and 1998. Top-level Superbike racing has also been hosted at Pembrey, in 1990 and 1994.

Over the winter of 2005/06 a new pit lane was constructed. Highlights on the current calendar (2018) include rounds of the British Rallycross Championship and two rounds of the British Truck Racing Championship, organized by the BTRA. The circuit serves as the main venue for the Welsh Sports and Saloon Car Championship, which has been particularly successful in recent years attracting a wide range of cars and averaging grids of over 20. In addition, the British Motorcycle Racing Club, the British Drift Championship and two single venue rallies, amongst others, were held in February and October.

Prost vs. Senna – Pembrey Folklore

Following an incident at  the 1989 San Marino Grand Prix, the Alain Prost/Ayrton Senna war began to build up speed after the Frenchman said that McLaren had a pre-race agreement that whoever led into the first turn should stay there, which was ironically suggested by Senna. In Prost's view, Senna had broken this agreement by passing him partway round the first lap after the restart. The following week McLaren were testing at Pembrey, and Ron Dennis (team principal) summoned both drivers to attend, as he was determined to re-establish law and order. Senna was refusing to apologise, and Jo Ramírez even heard that “he’d apparently said that the deal had been not to actually pass Prost by slipstreaming before that the move was allowable!” He really only apologised because of the pressure under which Dennis put him at Pembrey, and for the good of the team but he wasn’t happy about it.

Major race results

British Formula Three Championship

British Touring Car Championship

European Rallycross Championship

British Superbike Championship

See also
RAF Pembrey
Pembrey Airport
Court Farm, Pembrey
Llandow Circuit
Anglesey Circuit

Notes

References

External links
BARC Wales
Welsh Racing Drivers' Association
BARC

FIA Grade 4 circuit
Motorsport venues in Wales
Sport in Carmarthenshire
Sport in Llanelli